Thank You for Today is the ninth studio album by American indie rock band Death Cab for Cutie. The album was released on August 17, 2018, on Atlantic Records.

Production and release
The album was produced by Rich Costey, who returns after collaborating with the band on their eighth album, Kintsugi. It is the first Death Cab for Cutie release to not feature Chris Walla since the band's first album, You Can Play These Songs with Chords. The album also marks the first time guitarist/keyboardists Dave Depper and Zac Rae have appeared on a Death Cab for Cutie album, after making their debut recording with the band on the 2016 single "Million Dollar Loan".

The album was announced on June 13, 2018, along with the release of its first single, "Gold Rush". The band also announced a tour to support the album's release, beginning in fall 2018. Two further singles were released from the album prior to its release: "I Dreamt We Spoke Again" and "Autumn Love". On August 13, the album was streamed in full on NPR Music's website. "Gold Rush" was also included in the EA Sports  video game FIFA 19.

The album is dedicated to the memory of Scott Hutchison, frontman for the Scottish folk rock band Frightened Rabbit, who died in May 2018. Death Cab for Cutie singer Ben Gibbard was a friend of Hutchison and an admirer of his songwriting, and the two bands had toured together in 2008.

Critical reception

Thank You for Today currently holds a Metacritic score of 69, indicating generally favorable reviews. Madison Desler of Paste Magazine praised the album, describing it as "a fresh take on Death Cab's familiar sound" and "another fine stop in Death Cab's ongoing evolution." The Guardians Michael Hann was also positive in his four-star review, noting: "The melodies are gorgeous, never overdone but always foregrounded: you would get almost nothing from the individual elements, from the bass, the guitar, the keyboards and the voice, but they add up to much more than the sum of their parts."

Other reviews were more mixed in their reception, such as Pitchfork's Larry Fitzmaurice. His review acknowledged that while Thank You for Today was "the strongest Death Cab album of the 2010s," he also described that title as "a dubious achievement" and noted "there’s moments that suggest Gibbard and the rest of Death Cab are still struggling through the beige malaise that has cast a pall over their more recent work." Writing for Entertainment Weekly, Joseph Longo described Thank You for Today as the band's "midlife crisis record," adding: "...what once exuded cathartic melancholia has now matured into overwrought melodrama."

In a negative review of the album, Tyler Clark from Consequence of Sound criticised the production and the songwriting on the album. Noting that the album is Gibbard's first since he turned 40, Clark says that "without the will or ability to eschew generalities for details, he leaves his anti-gentrification songs undercooked and his middle-aged musings feeling perfunctory and safe."

Track listing
All lyrics written by Ben Gibbard. 

PersonnelDeath Cab for CutieBenjamin Gibbard – lead vocals, backing vocals, guitars, piano, keyboards, samples
Nick Harmer – bass, backing vocals on "Gold Rush"
Jason McGerr – drums, percussion, programming
Dave Depper – guitars, keyboards, backing vocals
Zac Rae – keyboards, guitars, backing vocals on "Gold Rush"Additional personnel'
Lauren Mayberry – additional vocals on "Northern Lights"
Rich Costey – production

Charts

References

2018 albums
Atlantic Records albums
Death Cab for Cutie albums
Albums recorded at Sound City Studios